Mother with Child, also known as Nurse, is an oil painting art series by Macedonian modern artist Nikola Martinoski created from the 1930s to the 1960s. The pictures depict a Macedonian Romani woman breastfeeding a child. The works mainly employ oil paint on canvas. The works today are considered as one of the finest art pieces in the contemporary Macedonian art.

References 

1930s paintings
1940s paintings
1950s paintings
1960s paintings